HMS P38 was a Royal Navy U-class submarine built by Vickers-Armstrong at Barrow-in-Furness.

Career 
P38 had a short-lived career with the Royal Navy. Commissioned in October 1941, she was assigned to operate with the 10th Flotilla based at Malta for operations in the Mediterranean Sewa in January 1942, under the command of Lieutenant Rowland Hemingway. On her first patrol she sank the Italian merchant ship Ariosto of 4,116 tons off Cape Afrika, Tunisia on 15 February 1942. 138 Allied prisoners of war aboard were lost. This was the only successful attack by P38.

Sinking 
P38 left Malta on 16 February 1942, to intercept a very important large supply convoy for Axis forces off Tripoli, Libya. By 23 February, she was in position as the group of ships approached. Amongst them was the Italian torpedo boat , equipped with German sonar and depth charge throwers.

Shortly after 10:32 (Italian time), following a single attack in which all depth charges were dropped by Circe, P38 rose only to sink immediately again. A large patch of oil appeared on the surface as well as debris and human remains. There were no survivors from her complement of 32.

References

 
 
 
 
 
 
 Wingate, John. The Fighting Tenth: The Tenth Submarine Flotilla and the Siege of Malta. Pen & Sword. 1991.  

 

British U-class submarines
Ships built in Barrow-in-Furness
1941 ships
World War II submarines of the United Kingdom
Lost submarines of the United Kingdom
Maritime incidents in February 1942
Warships lost in combat with all hands
Submarines sunk by Italian warships